The digits of some specific integers permute or shift cyclically when they are multiplied by a number n. Examples are:

142857 × 3 = 428571 (shifts cyclically one place left)
142857 × 5 = 714285 (shifts cyclically one place right)
128205 × 4 = 512820 (shifts cyclically one place right)
076923 × 9 = 692307 (shifts cyclically two places left)

These specific integers, known as transposable integers, can be but are not always cyclic numbers.  The characterization of such numbers can be done using repeating decimals (and thus the related fractions), or directly.

General
For any integer coprime to 10, its reciprocal is a repeating decimal without any non-recurring digits. E.g.  = 0.006993006993006993...

While the expression of a single series with vinculum on top is adequate, the intention of the above expression is to show that the six cyclic permutations of 006993 can be obtained from this repeating decimal if we select six consecutive digits from the repeating decimal starting from different digits.

This illustrates that cyclic permutations are somehow related to repeating decimals and the corresponding fractions.

The greatest common divisor (gcd) between any cyclic permutation of an m-digit integer and 10m − 1 is constant. Expressed as a formula,

where N is an m-digit integer; and Nc is any cyclic permutation of N.

For example, 
    gcd(091575, 999999) = gcd(32×52×11×37, 33×7×11×13×37)
                        = 3663
                        = gcd(915750, 999999)
                        = gcd(157509, 999999)
                        = gcd(575091, 999999)
                        = gcd(750915, 999999)
                        = gcd(509157, 999999)

If N is an m-digit integer, the number Nc, obtained by shifting N to the left cyclically, can be obtained from:

where d is the first digit of N and m is the number of digits.

This explains the above common gcd and the phenomenon is true in any base if 10 is replaced by b, the base.

The cyclic permutations are thus related to repeating decimals, the corresponding fractions, and divisors of 10m−1. For examples the related fractions to the above cyclic permutations are thus:
Reduced to their lowest terms using the common gcd, they are: 

That is, these fractions when expressed in lowest terms, have the same denominator. This is true for cyclic permutations of any integer.

Fraction method

Integral multiplier
An integral multiplier refers to the multiplier n being an integer:
 
An integer X shift right cyclically by k positions when it is multiplied by an integer n.
An integer X shift left cyclically by k positions when it is multiplied by an integer n.

It is necessary for F to be coprime to 10 in order that  is a repeating decimal without any preceding non-repeating digits (see multiple sections of Repeating decimal). If there are digits not in a period, then there is no corresponding solution.

For these two cases, multiples of X, i.e. (j X) are also solutions provided that the integer i satisfies the condition  < 1. Most often it is convenient to choose the smallest F that fits the above. 
The solutions can be expressed by the formula:

E.g, F0 = 1260 = 22 × 32 × 5 × 7. The factors excluding 2 and 5 recompose to F = 32 × 7 = 63. Alternatively, strike off all the ending zeros from 1260 to become 126, then  divide it by 2 (or 5) iteratively until the quotient is no more divisible by 2 (or 5). The result is also F = 63.

To exclude integers that begin with zeros from the solutions, select an integer j such that  > , i.e. j > .

There is no solution when n > F.

Fractional multiplier

An integer X shift left cyclically by k positions when it is multiplied by a fraction .

For this third case, multiples of X, i.e. (j X) are again solutions but the condition to be satisfied for integer j is that  < 1. Again it is convenient to choose the smallest F that fits the above.

The solutions can be expressed by the formula:

where p is defined likewise; and F is made coprime to 10 by the same process as before.

To exclude integers that begin with zeros from the solutions, select an integer j such that  > , i.e. j > .

Again if  > 1, there is no solution.

Direct representation  
The direct algebra approach to the above cases integral multiplier lead to the following formula:

where m is the number of digits of X, and D, the k-digit number shifted from the low end of X to the high end of n X, satisfies D < 10k.
If the numbers are not to have leading zeros, then  n 10k − 1 ≤ D.

where m is the number of digits of X, and D, the k-digit number shifted from the high end of X to the low end of n X, satisfies:

and the 10-part (the product of the terms corresponding to the primes 2 and 5 of the factorization) of 10k − n divides D.
The 10-part of an integer t is often abbreviated 
If the numbers are not to have leading zeros, then 10k − 1 ≤ D.

Cyclic permutation by multiplication 

A long division of 1 by 7 gives:

         0.142857...
     7 ) 1.000000
          .7
           3
           28
            2
            14
             6
             56
              4
              35
               5
               49
                1

At the last step, 1 reappears as the remainder. The cyclic remainders are {1, 3, 2, 6, 4, 5}. We rewrite the quotients with the corresponding dividend/remainders above them at all the steps:
     Dividend/Remainders    1 3 2 6 4 5
     Quotients              1 4 2 8 5 7

and also note that:

  = 0.142857...
  = 0.428571...
  = 0.285714...
  = 0.857142...
  = 0.571428...
  = 0.714285...

By observing the remainders at each step, we can thus perform a desired cyclic permutation by multiplication. E.g., 
The integer 142857, corresponding to remainder 1, permutes to 428571 when multiplied by 3, the corresponding remainder of the latter.
The integer 142857, corresponding to remainder 1, permutes to 857142 when multiplied by 6, the corresponding remainder of the latter.

In this manner, cyclical left or right shift of any number of positions can be performed.

Less importantly, this technique can be applied to any integer to shift cyclically right or left by any given number of places for the following reason:
Every repeating decimal can be expressed as a rational number (fraction).
Every integer, when added with a decimal point in front and concatenated with itself infinite times, can be converted to a fraction, e.g. we can transform 123456 in this manner to 0.123456123456..., which can thus be converted to fraction . This fraction can be further simplified but it will not be done here.
This looks like cheating but if  is a whole number (in this case it is not), the mission is completed.

Proof of formula for cyclical right shift operation

An integer X shift cyclically right by k positions when it is multiplied by an integer n. Prove its formula.

Proof

First recognize that X is the repeating digits of a repeating decimal, which always possesses cyclic behavior in multiplication. The integer X and its multiple n X then will have the following relationship:

The integer X is the repeating digits of the fraction , say dpdp-1...d3d2d1, where dp, dp-1, ..., d3, d2 and d1 each represents a digit and p is the number of digits.
The multiple n X is thus the repeating digits of the fraction , say dkdk-1...d3d2d1dpdp-1...dk+2dk+1, representing the results after right cyclical shift of k positions.
F must be coprime to 10 so that when  is expressed in decimal there is no preceding non-repeating digits otherwise the repeating decimal does not possess cyclic behavior in multiplication.
In order that n × 10k = 1 (mod F) then F shall be either F0 = (n × 10k - 1), or a factor of F0; but excluding any values not more than n and any value having a nontrivial common factor with 10, as deduced above.

This completes the proof.

Proof of formula for cyclical left shift operation

An integer X shift cyclically left by k positions when it is multiplied by an integer n. Prove its formula.

Proof

First recognize that X is the repeating digits of a repeating decimal, which always possesses a cyclic behavior in multiplication. The integer X and its multiple n X then will have the following relationship:

The integer X is the repeating digits of the fraction , say dpdp-1...d3d2d1 .
The multiple n X is thus the repeating digits of the fraction , say dp-kdp-k-1...d3d2d1dpdp-1...dp-k+1,
which represents the results after left cyclical shift of k positions.
F must be coprime to 10 so that  has no preceding non-repeating digits otherwise the repeating decimal does not possesses cyclic behavior in multiplication.
In order that 1 × 10k = n (mode F) then F shall be either F0 = (10k -n), or a factor of F0; but excluding any value not more than n, and any value having a nontrivial common factor with 10, as deduced above.

This completes the proof. The proof for non-integral multiplier such as  can be derived in a similar way and is not documented here.

Shifting an integer cyclically 
The permutations can be:

Shifting right cyclically by single position (parasitic numbers);
Shifting right cyclically by double positions;
Shifting right cyclically by any number of positions;
Shifting left cyclically by single position;
Shifting left cyclically by double positions; and
Shifting left cyclically by any number of positions

Parasitic numbers 

When a parasitic number is multiplied by n, not only it exhibits the cyclic behavior but the permutation is such that the last digit of the parasitic number now becomes the first digit of the multiple. For example, 102564 x 4 = 410256.

Shifting right cyclically by double positions 
An integer X shift right cyclically by double positions when it is multiplied by an integer n.

Most often it is convenient to choose the smallest  that fits the above.

Summary of results 
The following multiplication moves the last two digits of each original integer to the first two digits and shift every other digits to the right:

Note that:

There are many other possibilities.

Shifting left cyclically by single position 
Problem: An integer X shift left cyclically by single position when it is multiplied by 3. Find X.

Solution:
First recognize that X is the repeating digits of a repeating decimal, which always possesses some interesting cyclic behavior in multiplications.
The integer X and its multiple then will have the following relationship:

The integer X is the repeating digits of the fraction , say ab***.
The multiple is thus the repeating digits of the fraction , say b***a.
Thus  shall be 7 as 1 × 10 ÷ 7 gives remainder 3.

This yields the results that:

X = the repeating digits of 
=142857, and
the multiple = 142857 × 3 = 428571, the repeating digits of 

The other solution is represented by  x 3 = :
285714 x 3 = 857142

There are no other solutions  because:
Integer n must be the subsequent remainder in a long division of a fraction .
For n = 2, F must be 10 - 2 = 8. However  does not generate a repeating decimal, similarly for n = 5.
For n = 7, F must be 10 - 7 = 3. However 7 > 3 and  = 2.333 > 1 and does not fit the purpose.
Similarly there is no solution for any other integer of n less than 10 except n = 3.

However, if the multiplier is not restricted to be an integer (though ugly), there are many other solutions from this method.

The following summarizes some of the results found in this manner:

Shifting left cyclically by double positions 
An integer X shift left cyclically by double positions when it is multiplied by an integer n.

Most often it is convenient to choose the smallest  that fits the above.

Summary of results 

The following summarizes some of the results obtained in this manner, where the white spaces between the digits divide the digits into 10-digit groups:

Other bases 

In duodecimal system, the transposable integers are: (using inverted two and three for ten and eleven, respectively)

Note that the “Shifting left cyclically by single position” problem has no solution for the multiplier less than 12 except 2 and 5, the same problem in decimal system has no solution for the multiplier less than 10 except 3.

Notes

References 
P. Yiu, k-right-transposable integers, k-left-transposable integers Chap.18.1, 18.2 pp. 168/360 in 'Recreational Mathematics', https://web.archive.org/web/20090901180500/http://math.fau.edu/Yiu/RecreationalMathematics2003.pdf
C. A. Pickover, Wonders of Numbers, Chapter 28, Oxford University Press UK, 2000.

Gardner, Martin. Mathematical Circus: More Puzzles, Games, Paradoxes and Other Mathematical Entertainments From Scientific American. New York: The Mathematical Association of America, 1979. pp. 111–122.
Kalman, Dan; 'Fractions with Cycling Digit Patterns'  The College Mathematics Journal, Vol. 27, No. 2. (Mar., 1996), pp. 109–115.
 Leslie, John. "The Philosophy of Arithmetic: Exhibiting a Progressive View of the Theory and Practice of ....", Longman, Hurst, Rees, Orme, and Brown, 1820, 
 Wells, David; "The Penguin Dictionary of Curious and Interesting Numbers",  Penguin Press.  

Base-dependent integer sequences